Justin Charles Hamilton (born December 19, 1980) is an American-Belgian former professional basketball who played of shooting guard-point guard.  Hamilton played college basketball for the University of Florida, and then played professionally for several European teams.

High school
A four-year starter at Booker High School in Sarasota, Florida, Hamilton was the state of Florida's class 4A player of the year as a senior in 1999.

College
Hamilton accepted an athletic scholarship to attend the University of Florida, where he played for the Florida Gators men's basketball team under coach Billy Donovan from 1999 to 2003.  He played a combo guard role for the Gators, and helped lead the team to four consecutive NCAA Tournament appearances.  The Gators reached the finals of the 2000 NCAA Men's Division I Basketball Tournament, before losing to Michigan State 76–89.

Professional career
Went undrafted in the 2003 NBA draft.  Signed with the Detroit Pistons as a free agent. He was waived before the start of the season.  
Hamilton has been with  Spirou Charleroi of the Basketball League Belgium since 2007 where he helped lead the team to 5 Finals with 4 consecutive wins.

Belgian Nationality
Hamilton received his Belgian Citizenship in June 2013.

Championships
Spanish ACB (1): 2005
Belgian BLB (4): 2008, 2009, 2010, 2011

References

External links
Belgian League profile
Euroleague profile
Florida athletic profile

1980 births
Living people
American expatriate basketball people in Belgium
American expatriate basketball people in Greece
American expatriate basketball people in Italy
American expatriate basketball people in Poland
American expatriate basketball people in Spain
American men's basketball players
Basketball players from Florida
Florida Gators men's basketball players
Ionikos N.F. B.C. players
Iraklis Thessaloniki B.C. players
Liga ACB players
Mens Sana Basket players
Point guards
Asseco Gdynia players
Real Madrid Baloncesto players
Roanoke Dazzle players
Shooting guards
Spirou Charleroi players
Sportspeople from Sarasota, Florida
Valencia Basket players